The tenth and final season of the American crime thriller television series The Blacklist was ordered on February 22, 2022 and premiered on February 26, 2023, on NBC.

James Spader, Diego Klattenhoff, Hisham Tawfiq, Harry Lennix returned for the season, while Anya Banerjee debuted in a new main role. It is the first season of the series not to star Laura Sohn; it is also the second season without Megan Boone.

The season is produced by Davis Entertainment, Universal Television and Sony Pictures Television. John Eisendrath, John Davis, Joe Carnahan and John Fox continue to serve as executive producers of the series, while series creator Jon Bokenkamp returned as an executive producer.

Cast and characters

Main cast
 James Spader as Raymond "Red" Reddington
 Diego Klattenhoff as Donald Ressler 
 Anya Banerjee as Siya Malik
 Hisham Tawfiq as Dembe Zuma
 Harry Lennix as Harold Cooper

Recurring
 Chin Han as Wujing
 Teddy Coluca as Teddy Brimley
 Jonathan Holtzman as Chuck 
 Sami Bray as Agnes Keen
 Deirdre Lovejoy as Cynthia Panabaker
 Alex Brightman as Herbie

Guest starring
 Amir Arison as Aram Mojtabai
 Stacy Keach as Robert Vesco
 Laverne Cox as Dr. Laken Perillos
 Daniel Sauli as The Freelancer
 Aaron Yoo as The Troll Farmer

Episodes

Production

Development
On February 22, 2022, James Spader announced the renewal of the series while making his appearance on The Tonight Show Starring Jimmy Fallon, with the NBC press release coming out shortly after. 

On February 1, 2023, NBC officially announced that the season would serve as the last of the series. The same day, the poster and the trailer for the season were released. James Spader later revealed that the season was planned as final before the filming so to finish the series properly. He also noted that for him the series would shift from its original conception if it went beyond this season.

Casting
On May 27, 2022, it was revealed that original cast member Amir Arison and another main actress, Laura Sohn, would depart the series following the finale of season 9. However, Arison stated that he and producers had been discussing his potential return to the series after The Kite Runner, the play he left the series for, ends its run on Broadway. Later, on October 6, he was invited to a 200 episode celebration, where in a series of posts he made another hint on his potential return. On February 22, 2023, an exclusive preview of the season premiere revealed the return of Arison to the series.

On August 9, 2022, it was revealed that casting was in process for the role of Siya Malik, an MI6 intelligence officer, who was a daughter to Meera Malik, the character introduced in the first season. On October 6 celebration, it was disclosed that Anya Banerjee had accepted the role.

Various recurring stars have already confirmed their returns for the series. In September 2022, such announcements were made by Chin Han, Jonathan Holtzman and Teddy Coluca. Deirdre Lovejoy, who portrays United States Senator Cynthia Panabaker, was also involved in filming of the season. Sami Bray, who portrayed Agnes Keen in the ninth season, would also be returning. Stacy Keach, portraying Robert Vesco, is scheduled to return alongside Lovejoy in the third episode. The trailer also revealed the return of Laverne Cox and Daniel Sauli as former blacklisters.

On November 23, Chris McKenna wrote that he would be joining the series as one of Wujing's contrct associates. On March 9, 2023, it was revealed that Alex Brightman would recur in the season as Red's forensic scientist.

Filming and release
Filming for the season started in September 2022, as was previously expected by location manager of the series Tom Scutro. On October 6, filming for the 4th episode in the season, which is also 200th overall, was finished and celebrated with a special event at their set in Chelsea Piers, in which the Task Force headquarters are located.

With the release of NBC’s fall schedule on May 26, 2022, it was revealed that the series would not air until midseason. Such move had only been implemented to season 6 before. On November 7, it was set that the series would premiere on Sunday, February 26, 2023, on 8:00 p.m.. However, due to the network's increased interest to Found, a new drama originally set to air following The Blacklist, subsequent corrections to the midseason schedule were performed by NBC. The season's regular timeslot would be 10:00 p.m., following season 5 of revived Magnum P.I.. Each episode would be available to stream on Peacock the next day after its initial release on NBC.

While announcing the renewal of the series in February, Spader noted that a 22-episode season is expected to be produced,  which was later confirmed by TVLine on November 18, 2022.

Spader was set for an appearance on The Tonight Show to promote the series on February 16, 2023, but failed to show up. Instead, the episode featured Travis Kelce, an american football player for Kansas City Chiefs.

Ratings

References

External links
 
 

2023 American television seasons
10